Pwera Usog is a 2017 Filipino supernatural horror thriller film directed by Jason Paul Laxamana. It was produced under Regal Entertainment.

Premise

It tells the story of a group of pranksters who scares a homeless girl and accidentally injuring her to death. One by one, they start encountering a shadow whose glare causes them to fall severely ill and die.

Cast
 Joseph Marco as Sherwin
 Sofia Andres as Jean
 Albie Casiño as Bobby
 Devon Seron as Luna
 Kiko Estrada as Quintin
 Aiko Melendez as Minda
 Eula Valdes as Catalina
 Erlinda Villalobos as Magda
 Cherise Castro as Val
 Gelo Alvaran as Young Quintin

Production
Pwera Usog was directed by Jason Paul Laxamana’ under the film studio, Regal Entertainment. The members of the cast of Pwera Usog was selected by Regal Entertainment rather than Laxamana. Laxamana, whose first horror film was Pwera Usog, says it is a challenge directing a film belonging to the horror genre and mentioned how there must be a proper build up before executing the "moment of horror". He directed the film in the premise on how to startle people who have seen horror films and other scary videos online.

The film's theme is centered on usog an affliction in Filipino superstition associated with being greeted by a stranger. Pwera Usog was targeted towards a young demographic particularly the "urban millennial". Laxamana incorporated technology and social media, as well as used a cast composed of mainly millennial to connect with the target demographic and introduce to them the concept of usog without alienating them.

Laxamana described the direction of the film as deviating from Asian horror-type of films the Philippine audience is used to which employs shock and surprise tactics and promise the audience of more "action scenes" which he says will surprise viewers but leave them laughing at themselves at their own reactions. The director said he was also inspired from a "side" of him for the directorial decision of adding "disgusting scenes" to Pwera Usog and narrated on how he liked to scare his family and friends as a child by describing scenarios that will make them grossed out or uncomfortable.

Release
Pwera Usog was among the three films Regal Entertainment planned to submit as an entry at the 2016 Metro Manila Film Festival. The film was not selected as one of the eight official entries of the film festival that ran from December 25, 2016, to January 7, 2017. The film had an official trailer which garnered at least 5 million views online. On March 8, 2017, the film had its theatrical debut in Philippine cinemas.

The film was screened at the 17th Neuchâtel International Fantastic Film Festival in Switzerland, a genre film festival which ran from June 30 to July 8, 2017.

Reception
The Cinema Evaluation Board gave Pwera Usog an "A" rating.

References

2017 horror films
Philippine horror films
Regal Entertainment films